Glan-y-Llyn railway station is a disused railway station in Rhondda Cynon Taf, South Wales.

History
The station was opened in 1911 by the Cardiff Railway. It lay near to the junction with the Taff Vale Railway, at Taffs Well station. It served Glan-y-Llyn, a district of Taffs Well. Glan-y-Llyn was a substantial structure, comprising a brick station building, two platforms linked by a footbridge, a signal box (which opened in 1909), and a large goods shed which lay to the south of the passenger facilities.

The Great Western Railway, in response to the slim profits of the line, closed the signal box in 1927, and the 'down' platform was taken out of use in 1928. The section of track on which the station lay was later reopened as a freight-only link, providing access to Nantgarw Colliery, surviving  until 1988.

After Closure
The station building still stands and is now in use as a private residence. The structure has been considerably altered.

References

Railway stations in Great Britain opened in 1911
Railway stations in Great Britain closed in 1931
Disused railway stations in Cardiff
Former Cardiff Railway stations
1911 establishments in Wales
1931 disestablishments in Wales